Indirect elections were held for the presidency and vice-presidency of the government of the Republic of China on Taiwan on March 21, 1960. The vote took place at the Chung-Shan Hall in Taipei. Incumbent President Chiang Kai-shek and Vice-President Chen Cheng was re-elected.

Before the election, the National Assembly amended the Temporary Provisions against the Communist Rebellion which allowed the President and Vice-President to seek for third term, which superseded the Article 47 of the Constitution of the Republic of China, in order to make way for Chiang to be re-elected. As a result, Chiang received 1,481 votes of the 1,576 National Assembly members, while his running mate Chen Cheng was re-elected with 1,381 votes. The term began on May 20, 1960.

Electors

The election was conducted by the National Assembly in its meeting place Chung-Shan Hall in Taipei. According to the Temporary Provisions against the Communist Rebellion, the term of the delegates who were elected during the 1947 Chinese National Assembly election was extended indefinitely until "re-election is possible in their original electoral district". In total, there were 1,521 delegates reported to the secretariat to attend this third session of the first National Assembly.

Results

President

Vice president

See also
History of Republic of China
President of the Republic of China
Vice President of the Republic of China

References

Presidential elections in Taiwan
1960 in Taiwan
Taiwan